Toivo Vaikvee (born 7 June 1947 in Esbjerg, Denmark) is a former New Zealand cricketer who played for Wellington in the Plunket Shield and Shell Trophy during the 1970s.

After attending Palmerston North Boys' High School, where he captained the First XI, he worked in the insurance business. A leg-spinner, his best performance in first-class cricket was for Wellington against Northern Districts in 1973–74, when he took 4 for 41 and 3 for 99 in a 98-run victory. He played Hawke Cup cricket for Manawatu in the 1960s.

References

1947 births
Living people
New Zealand cricketers
Wellington cricketers
Danish emigrants to New Zealand
Danish cricketers
People from Esbjerg
People educated at Palmerston North Boys' High School
Sportspeople from the Region of Southern Denmark